The 2011 Australian Rally Championship is series of five rallying events held across Australia, including the World Rally Championship event, Rally Australia and Asia Pacific Rally Championship event, 2011 International Rally of Queensland. It is the 44th season in the history of the competition and the first in several decades to not feature any former champions.

Mitsubishi driver Justin Dowel leads the points race by 21 points over Toyota driver Ryan Smart. Both drivers broke through for their first Australian Rally Championship victories this season, Smart at the season opening Forest Rally, Dowell at the most recent event, Rally SA. The pair between them have won all Legs and Rallies. Mitsubishi driver Mark Pedder sits third in the points, 19 behind Smart, with a string of second placings contributing to the pointscore.

The Rallies

The 2011 season featured five rallies, each held in a different state. Rally Australia returns to the calendar but Rally Tasmania and Coffs Coast Rally have been dropped.

Teams & Drivers

The following are the competitors from the 2011 ARC season.

Drivers Championship
Pointscore as follows.

References

Rally Championship
Australia
Rally competitions in Australia